Min Zhen (1730–?; courtesy name Zheng Zhai 正齋) was a Chinese painter and seal carver born in Nanchang, Jiangxi, who spent most of his life in Hubei. He was noted for painting human figures and doing occasional finger painting. He was orphaned at an early age and is sometimes associated with the Eight Eccentrics of Yangzhou.

References
Chinese Paintings in the Ashmolean Museum Oxford(118-121) Oxford 
Cultural China 

1730 births
People from Nanchang
Qing dynasty painters
Year of death unknown
Painters from Jiangxi
Chinese seal artists